Parung Ho clan is one of the Korean clans. Their Bon-gwan is in Fuzhou, China. According to the research held in 1985, the number of Parung Ho clan's member was 1487. Their founder was Ho Geuk gi in Song dynasty. Ho Geuk gi officially began Parung Ho clan after he was naturalized in Korea instead of coming back to China because of Ming dynasty’s destruction by Qing dynasty. Before then, he worked as Hanlin Academy at the end of Ming dynasty and was dispatched to Korea as an envoy during Injo of Joseon’s reign.

See also 
 Korean clan names of foreign origin

References

External links 
 

 
Korean clan names of Chinese origin
Ho clans